

Captains of Northamptonshire County Cricket Club
Northamptonshire County Cricket Club (Northants), based on an existing organisation that dated from 1820, was officially founded on 31 July 1878 in Kettering.
 

Northants joined the County Championship in 1905, when the team was elevated to first-class status, and is one of eighteen county teams in England that play first-class cricket. 

The player appointed club captain leads the team in all fixtures except if unavailable.

 J. P. Kingston (1878–1887; 1890–1891)
 C. R. Thursby (1888)
 T. H. G. Welch (1889)
 F. Tyler (1892)
 E. Scriven (1893)
 A. G. Henfrey (1894–1895)
 T. Horton (1896–1906)
 E. M. Crosse (1907)
 T. E. Manning (1908–1910)
 G. A. T. Vials (1911–1913)
 S. G. Smith (1913–1914)
 J. N. Beasley (1919)
 R. O. Raven (1920–1921)
 C. H. Tyler (1922)
 A. H. Bull (1923–1924)
 J. M. Fitzroy (1925–1927)
 V. W. C. Jupp (1927–1931)
 W. C. Brown (1932–1935)
 G. B. Cuthbertson (1936–1937)
 R. P. Nelson (1938–1939)
 P. E. Murray-Willis (1946)
 J. Webster (1946)
 A. W. Childs-Clarke (1947–1948)
 F. R. Brown (1949–1953)
 D. Brookes (1954–1957)
 R. Subba Row (1958–1961)
 K. V. Andrew (1962–1966)
 R. M. Prideaux (1967–1970)
 P. J. Watts (1971–1974; 1978–1980) 
 R. T. Virgin (1975)
 Mushtaq Mohammad (1976–1977)
 G. Cook (1981–1988)
 A. J. Lamb (1989–1995)
 R. J. Bailey (1996–1997)
 K. M. Curran (1998)
 M. L. Hayden (1999–2000)
 D. Ripley (2001)
 M. E. K. Hussey (2002–2003)
 D. J. G. Sales (2004–2007)
 N. Boje (2008–2010)
 A. J. Hall (2010–2012)
 S. D. Peters (2013–2014)
 A. J. Wakely (2015–2019)
 A. M. Rossington (2019–2021)
 R. S. Vasconcelos (2022)
 W. A. Young (2022) 
 L.A.Procter (2023 to date)

See also
 List of Northamptonshire CCC players

References

Sources
 Northamptonshire County Cricket Club Yearbook, 2009
 Andrew Radd, 100 Greats – Northamptonshire County Cricket Club, Tempus, 2001

 
Northamptonshire cricket captains
Northamptonshire County Cricket Club
Cricketers
Northamptonshire